The 2013 Varsity Cup was contested from 4 February to 8 April 2013. The tournament (also known as the FNB Varsity Cup presented by Steinhoff International for sponsorship reasons) was the sixth season of the Varsity Cup, an annual inter-university rugby union competition featuring eight South African universities.

No team was relegated to the second-tier Varsity Shield competition for 2014.

Competition rules and information

There were eight participating universities in the 2013 Varsity Cup. These teams played each other once over the course of the season, either home or away.

Teams received four points for a win and two points for a draw. Bonus points were awarded to teams that scored four or more tries in a game, as well as to teams that lost a match by seven points or less. Teams were ranked by log points, then points difference (points scored less points conceded).

The top four teams qualified for the title play-offs. In the semi-finals, the team that finished first had home advantage against the team that finished fourth, while the team that finished second had home advantage against the team that finished third. The winners of these semi-finals played each other in the final, at the home venue of the higher-placed team.

There was no relegation to the Varsity Shield at the end of the season.

The 2013 Varsity Cup used a different scoring system than the common scoring system. Tries were worth five points as usual, but conversions were worth three points instead of two, while penalties and drop goals were only worth two points instead of three.

Teams

The following teams took part in the 2013 Varsity Cup competition:

Standings

The final league standings for the 2013 Varsity Cup were:

Fixtures

The 2015 Varsity Cup fixtures were released as follows:

 All times are South African (GMT+2).

Round one

Round two

Round three

Round four

Round five

Round six

Round seven

Semi-finals

Final

Honours

The honour roll for the 2013 Varsity Cup was as follows:

Players

Squad lists

The teams released the following squad lists:

Forwards

 Brianton Booysen
 Lungelo Chonco
 Nick de Jager
 Jan de Klerk
 Beyers de Villiers
 Charl de Villiers
 Neethling Gericke
 Os Hamman
 Reniel Hugo
 Reuben Johannes
 Frederick Kirsten
 Helmut Lehmann
 Niel Oelofse
 Brandon Pitzer
 Jurg Streicher
 Hein van der Merwe
 Wilhelm van der Sluys
 Jurie van Vuuren
 Alistair Vermaak
 Did not play:
 Schalk Ferreira
 Attie Joubert
 Boeta Kleinhans
 Hugo Kloppers
 Basil Liebenberg
 Derick Linde
 Cameron Lindsay
 Alfred Ries
 Erik van Zyl
Backs

 James Alexander
 Craig Barry
 Hayden de Villiers
 Dean Grant
 Dean Hammond
 Mark Hodgskiss
 Louis Jordaan
 Clearance Khumalo
 JP Lewis
 Jean Nel
 Ryan Nell
 JH Potgieter
 Warren Seals
 Andries Truter
 Did not play:
 Rob Ahlers
 Jarryd Buys
 Wessel Coetzee
 Jan de Wet
 Gerhard Jordaan
 Johnny Kôtze
 Pieter Peens
 Caleb Smith
 Gideon Strydom
 Nico van der Westhuizen
 Christof van Tonder
 Devon Williams
Coach

 Chris Rossouw

Forwards

 Tim Agaba
 Francois Coetzer
 Albé de Swardt
 Dexter Fahey
 Martin Ferreira
 Louis Fourie
 Ferdi Gerber
 Roy Godfrey
 Lizo Gqoboka
 Gareth Hartley
 Elrich Kock
 Schalk Oelofse
 Brenden Olivier
 Marius Oosthuizen
 Ulrich Pretorius
 Brian Shabangu
 Stefan Willemse
 Mzwanele Zito
 Did not play:
 Chad Banfield
 Reece Dabner
 Hannes Huisamen
 Marius le Roux
 Rob Louw
 Francois Nel
Backs

 Logan Basson
 Jarryd Buys
 Dwayne Kelly
 Devon Lailvaux
 Lesley Luiters
 Howard Mnisi
 Mayibuye Ndwandwa
 Yamkela Ngam
 Foxy Ntleki
 Brian Skosana
 Gerrit Smith
 Billy van Lill
 Justin van Staden
 Did not play:
 Ruan Allerston
 Drew du Toit
 Andile Jho
 Bradley Kretzmann
 Louis Kruger
 Charlie Purdon
 Marlin Ruiters
 Shane Swart
 Phumezo Orlando Tom                    
 Kayle van Zyl
Coach

 Brent Janse van Rensburg

Forwards

 Herman Basson
 Molotsi Bouwer
 Stompie de Wet
 Martin Dreyer
 Arno Ebersohn
 Marius Fourie
 Marcel Groenewald
 Danie Jordaan
 Strand Kruger
 Robey Labuschagné
 MB Lusaseni
 Mash Mafela
 SJ Niemand
 JC Oberholzer
 Pens Scharneck
 Solly Sotsaka
 Ernie Strydom
 HP Swart
 Akker van der Merwe
 Elardus Venter
 Did not play:
 Bok Barnard
 Wian Fourie
 Pikkie Nortjé
 Chris Schoonraad
 Lodewyk Uys
 Peet van der Walt
 JC Wasserman
Backs

 Rowayne Beukman
 Justin Botha
 Lucian Cupido
 Johan Deysel
 Tiaan Dorfling
 Jaco Grobler
 Sylvian Mahuza
 Hoffmann Maritz
 Gerhard Nortier
 Luther Obi
 Wynand Olivier
 SW Oosthuizen
 Hennie Skorbinski
 Pieter Smith
 Did not play:
 Kobus du Plessis
 Janus Jonker
 Rudolph Stephanus Muller                
 Heinrich Smith
Coach

 Hannes Esterhuizen

Forwards

 Derek Asbun
 Brad Bosman
 Mike Botha
 Joel Carew
 Johno de Klerk
 Dayne Jans
 Josh Katzen
 Oli Kebble
 James Kilroe
 Jason Klaasen
 Kyle Kriel
 Shaun McDonald
 Shane Meier
 Darryl Ndjadila
 Levi Odendaal
 Neil Rautenbach
 Ntsolo Setlaba
 Sti Sithole
 Digby Webb
 Michael Willemse
 Did not play:
 Stephen Buerger
 Deacon Chowles
 André Mark du Plessis                   
 Matthew Faught
 Vince Jobo
 Timmy Louw
 Peter Olivier
 Gareth Topkin
 Francois van Wyk
Backs

 David Ambunya
 Tiger Bax
 Paul Cohen
 Justin Coles
 Nick Holton
 Ross Jones-Davies
 Dillyn Leyds
 Nico Loizides
 Nate Nel
 Dylan Sage
 Ricky Schroeder
 Liam Slatem
 Richard Stewart
 Lihleli Xoli
 Did not play:
 Darryn Berry
 Tonderai Chigumadzi
 Ryan Dugmore
 Nick Farrar
 Dylon Frylinck
 Selom Gavor
 Jason Germishuys
 Kyle Lombard
 Robbie Louw
 Steve Wallace
Coach

 Kevin Foote

Forwards

 JC Astle
 Luan de Bruin
 Wickus Deysel
 Jacques du Toit
 Elandré Huggett
 Niell Jordaan
 Armandt Koster
 Erik le Roux
 Charles Marais
 Oupa Mohojé
 Freddy Ngoza
 Nick Schonert
 Tyron Schultz
 Vaatjie van der Merwe
 Schalk van der Merwe
 Fanie van der Walt
 Carl van Heerden
 JC van Wyk
 Henco Venter
 Lebo Zietsman
 Did not play:
 Neil Claassen
 Curtley de Kock
 Boxer de Villiers
 Heinrich Renoir Douglas                 
 Joubert Horn
 Barend Koortzen
 De Wet Kruger
 Pieter Matthee
 Justin Pappin
 Boom Prinsloo
 Egbert Ras
 Adriaan Schoeman
Backs

 Renier Botha
 JJ de Klerk
 Pieter-Steyn de Wet
 Maphutha Dolo
 Franna du Toit
 Reinhardt Erwee
 Kay-Kay Hlongwane
 Kevin Luiters
 Marco Mason
 Nico Scheepers
 Thys Smit
 Earl Snyman
 Divandré Strydom
 Sethu Tom
 Stephan van der Merwe
 Robbie van Schalkwyk
 Did not play:
 AJ Coertzen
 Erick Colyn
 Marnus Marais
 Niel Marais
 Pieter Rademan
 Lance Ruthford
 Vink van der Walt
Coach

 Michael Horak

Forwards

 David Antonites
 Fabian Booysen
 Van Zyl Botha
 Steph de Witt
 Wessel du Rand
 Wiseman Kamanga
 Shane Kirkwood
 AJ le Roux
 RJ Liebenberg
 Thiliphatu Marole
 Malcolm Marx
 Njabulo Mkize
 Kobus Porter
 Johan van der Hoogt
 Erasmus van der Linde
 Ewald van der Westhuizen
 Justin Wheeler
 Did not play:
 Ian Barnard
 Henri Boshoff                    
 Daneel Ellis
 Lourens Erasmus
 Mitchell Hildebrand
 Henru Liebenberg
 Gareth Milasinovich
 Stephan Nel
 Dylan Peterson
 Sean Pretorius
 Jannes Snyman
 Griffith van Wyk
 Wimpie Wentzel
Backs

 Chrysander Botha
 Guy Cronjé
 Tommy Damba
 Kobus de Kock
 JR Esterhuizen
 Lincoln Koopman
 Bradley Moolman
 Andries Oosthuizen
 Jacques Pretorius
 Luan Steenkamp
 Vian van der Watt
 Divan van Zyl
 Lukas van Zyl
 Adrian Vermeulen
 PJ Walters
 Did not play:
 Michael John Bean
 Chuma Sean Faas                         
 Thato Thomas Marobela                   
 Lucien Kirk Ruiters                     
 Marais Schmidt
 Ethan Charles Searle                    
 Dauw Steyn
tbc

 James Craig Bester                      
 Devlin Hope                             
 Johannes Olivier                        
 Cornelius Francois Vermeulen            
Coach

 Hugo van As

Forwards

 Shaun Adendorff
 Andrew Beerwinkel
 Jean Cook
 Jacques du Plessis
 Frederic Eksteen
 Christoph Gouws
 Wesley Kotzé
 Wiaan Liebenberg
 Bongi Mbonambi
 JP Mostert
 Sabelo Nhlapo
 Marvin Orie
 Stephan Pretorius
 Jono Ross
 Juan Schoeman
 Basil Short
 Sidney Tobias
 Nardus van der Walt
 Schalk van Heerden
 Hencus van Wyk
 Jacques Verwey
 Jaco Visagie
 Paul Willemse
 Mike Williams
 Did not play:
 Zane Botha
 Clyde Davids                     
 Gerhard Engelbrecht
 Victor Hechter
 Irné Herbst
 Jono Janse van Rensburg
 Dennis Visser
Backs

 Clayton Blommetjies
 Christopher Bosch
 Riaan Britz
 Willie du Plessis
 Danie Faasen
 Lohan Jacobs
 Piet Lindeque
 Burger Odendaal
 Handré Pollard
 Tian Schoeman
 Courtnall Skosan
 William Small-Smith
 Clayton Stewart
 Emile Temperman
 Vainon Willis
 Did not play:
 Travis Ismaiel
 Jesse Kriel
 Donnovan Marais
 Sampie Mastriet
 Damian van Wyk
Coach

 Nollis Marais

Forwards

 Rory Anderson
 Charlie Baggot
 Rinus Bothma
 Piers Cooper
 Jason Fraser
 Carel Greeff
 JP Jonck
 Ferdinand Kelly
 KK Kgame
 Shai Korb
 Jeremiah Latana
 Hannes Ludick
 Wandile Lupuwane
 Thato Mavundla
 Devin Montgomery
 Katlego Ntsie
 Luvuyo Pupuma
 Cameron Shafto
 Pieter van Biljon
 Bradley van Niekerk
 Phaka Zuma
 Did not play:
 Chad Erasmus
 Sam Peter
 Rendani Ramovha
 Juandré Venter
Backs

 Riaan Arends
 Greg Blom
 Brent Crossley
 Mandla Dube
 Josh Durbach
 Jacques Erasmus
 Kayde Fisher
 Latiume Fosita
 Nkuli Gamede
 Bronson Lange
 Jared Meyer
 Ish Nkolo
 Kyle Peyper
 Michael Sephton-Poultney
 Matt Torrance
 Did not play:
 Kenneth du Plessis
 Juan Petrus du Toit                     
 Grant Janke
 Andrew Keightley-Smith
 Juandré Wurth
Coach

 Andy Royle

See also

 Varsity Cup
 2013 Varsity Rugby
 2013 Varsity Shield
 2013 SARU Community Cup
 2013 Vodacom Cup

References

External links
 
 

2013
2013 in South African rugby union
2013 rugby union tournaments for clubs